Wu Jing (born 1 July 1949) is a Chinese actress. She starred in many films in the 1980s and 1990s. She is also known for her roles in many popular TV series, like Sinful Debt (1995) and The Story of a Noble Family (2003).

Biography
Both of Wu Jing's parents Wu Fuhai and Pan Wenzheng were in the People's Liberation Army when she was born near the end of the Chinese Civil War. Wu Jing grew up in Shanghai, and after graduating from Nanyang Model High School in the Cultural Revolution, was "sent-down" to work in Yuyao and later Dafeng County. Despite passing all qualification tests Wu was repeatedly denied entry to art troupes only because her parents were labeled "Capitalist roaders" during the time. It wasn't until 1975 that she landed a supporting role in the propaganda film Breaking with Old Ideas. She became an affiliated actress with the Shanghai Film Studio only in 1984.

In May 2013, Wu Jing was voted one of the 9 vice-chairpeople of the Shanghai Film Association.

Personal life
Wu Jing and her husband Zhang Yuan appeared in many films together, such as Clown's Adventure (1990).

Filmography

Films

Drama series

Awards and nominations

References

External links

1949 births
Living people
20th-century Chinese actresses
21st-century Chinese actresses
Actresses from Jiangsu
Actresses from Shanghai
Chinese film actresses
Chinese television actresses
Sent-down youths